Formula F is one of the oldest classes competed at the SCCA National Championship Runoffs. 

Formula Ford was first introduced at the Runoffs in 1969 at Daytona. The first edition featured 21 drivers with Skip Barber winning the race and scoring the fastest lap. Most cars in the field were imported British Formula Ford cars such as the Merlyn, Lotus and Royale. Barber also won the second edition in 1970. The following decades saw many racing drivers competed in various different racing chassis. Dave Weitzenhof is the most successful driver in the class winning four times, each at Road Atlanta. 

The introduction of the Swift DB1 in 1983 started an era of dominance. The chassis type won the race ten times. The chassis type also won ten consecutive pole positions between 1983 and 1992. In 2009 the Honda L engine was introduced alongside the Ford Kent engine and Ford Cortina engine. In 2012 the first Formula F Runoffs was won by a Honda engine.

Race winners

See also
 F1600 Championship Series

References

Sports Car Club of America
Formula Ford